The following highways are numbered 202:

Canada
 Manitoba Provincial Road 202
 Newfoundland and Labrador Route 202
 Nova Scotia Route 202
 Prince Edward Island Route 202
 Quebec Route 202
 Saskatchewan Highway 202

China
 China National Highway 202

Costa Rica
 National Route 202

India
 National Highway 202 (India)

Japan
 Japan National Route 202

Korea, South
 Iksan–Pohang Expressway Branch

United States
 U.S. Route 202
 Alabama State Route 202
 Arizona Loop 202
 Arkansas Highway 202
 California State Route 202
 Colorado State Highway 202
 Delaware Route 202
 Florida State Road 202
 Georgia State Route 202
 Iowa Highway 202
 K-202 (Kansas highway)
 Maryland Route 202
 Minnesota State Highway 202 (former)
 Missouri Route 202
 Montana Secondary Highway 202
 New Hampshire Route 202A
 New Mexico State Road 202
North Carolina Highway 202 (former)
 Ohio State Route 202
 Oregon Route 202
 Pennsylvania Route 202
 South Carolina Highway 202
 Tennessee State Route 202
 Texas State Highway 202
 Utah State Route 202
 Virginia State Route 202
 Washington State Route 202

Fiction 
Route 202, a fictional route in Sinnoh, one of the regions in the Pokémon video games
Route 202, mentioned in an episode of The Simpsons as the road connecting Jefferson and Springfield. It is not mentioned what other town the road goes through.